The Littlejohn Coliseum is a 9,000-seat multi-purpose arena in Clemson, South Carolina, United States.  It is home to the Clemson University Tigers men's and women's basketball teams.  It is also the site of Clemson graduations and the Clemson Career Fair. It is owned and operated by Clemson University and hosts more than 150 events per year including concerts, trade shows, galas, and sporting events.

History
Littlejohn Coliseum was first opened in 1968. Along with basketball, the Coliseum has hosted concerts by Rod Stewart, Huey Lewis & The News, John Cougar Mellencamp, Ozzy Osbourne, David Lee Roth, and many others.

In 2011, Clemson announced a $50 million athletic building plan. As a part of this plan, Littlejohn Coliseum was renovated. An additional practice facility was built at the southwest corner of Littlejohn Coliseum. Cost for the project was estimated at $5 million.  The renovation was completed with an opening ceremony on October 14, 2016.  The construction project cost a total of $63.5 million.  The renovated studio included the new Swann Pavilion, which includes a  practice gym, team suites, a film room, weight room and lounges.  The renovation also upgraded the stadium entrance, exterior, and added two new LED boards. To fit in the new facilities, the basketball floor was rotated 90 degrees, and the arena capacity was reduced to 9,000 seats.

See also
 List of NCAA Division I basketball arenas

References

External links
Official site
Littlejohn Coliseum - Clemson Tigers Official Athletics Site

College basketball venues in the United States
Basketball venues in South Carolina
Clemson Tigers basketball venues
1968 establishments in South Carolina
Sports venues in Pickens County, South Carolina
Sports venues completed in 1968